Timothy Pleydell-Bouverie (born June 1987) is a British historian and former political journalist at Channel 4 News.

Early life and education 
Bouverie is the son of the Honourable Peter John Pleydell-Bouverie and the Honourable Jane Victoria Gilmour. His paternal grandfather is Jacob Pleydell-Bouverie, 8th Earl Radnor and his maternal grandfather is Ian Hedworth John Little Gilmour, Baron Gilmour of Craigmillar. He was educated at Bryanston School before going to Christ Church, Oxford to read history.

Career
Between 2013 and 2017, he was a political journalist at Channel 4 News, at first part of Dispatches and later as a producer for Michael Crick. Bouverie's first book, Appeasing Hitler, was published by Bodley Head in April 2019. Appeasing Hitler was a Sunday Times Bestseller and described as an "astonishingly accomplished debut" by Antony Beevor.

Books 
 Appeasing Hitler: Chamberlain, Churchill and the Road to War (Bodley Head, 2019)

References

External links 

 Tim Bouverie on The Daily Telegraph
 Tim Bouverie on The Spectator

Living people
People educated at Bryanston School
Alumni of Christ Church, Oxford
British historians
1987 births